The 1958-59 Australians defeated the touring England team 4-0 in the 1958–59 Ashes series. They were seen by the English press as having little chance of winning the series against the powerful England touring team. They had only one recognised great player, Neil Harvey and had lost the fast bowling combination of Ray Lindwall and Keith Miller and the other veterans of Don Bradman's Invincible 1948 team. There were, however, signs of recovery to those who would see them and E.W. Swanton believed that on their home ground Australia would be a shade better than England. The best indication of the forthcoming series was the M.C.C. and Australian tours of South Africa in 1956-57 and 1957-58. South Africa had a strong team in the 1950s, stunning the cricketing world by drawing 2-2 in Australia in 1953-54, losing 3-2 in the closely fought 1955 series in England and fighting back from a 2-0 deficit to draw 2-2 with Peter May's England in 1956-57. In 1957-58 Ian Craig led a team labelled as the weakest to leave Australia to a 3-0 victory over the Springboks with Richie Benaud, Alan Davidson, Wally Grout, Ken Mackay, Colin McDonald, Jim Burke and Lindsay Kline all in fine form. Norm O'Neill was not taken on tour, but struck innings of 175 in three hours and 233 in four hours in successive games against Victoria and was regarded as the "New Bradman".

The Captain
Richie's great ability as a captain is best gauged by the fact that he took an ordinary Australian team and shaped it into a winning side...he got some outstanding results with teams under him that would not bear comparison with the finest in Australian cricket history. It was his positive, attack-minded leadership that made all the difference.
Tom Graveney

Richie Benaud was a leg-spin bowler who had taken 49 Test wickets (34.41) when he left England in 1956, but grabbed 23 wickets (16.83) India, including his first three 5 wicket innings and his best Test bowling figures of 7/72. His cricket improved in South Africa in 1957–58 where he took 30 wickets (21.93) and another four 5 wicket hauls and made 329 runs (54.83) with two centuries. His attacking cricket impressed Sir Donald Bradman and the Australian selectors and he was the surprise choice as captain when Ian Craig retired due to ill-health. Neil Harvey was vice captain and Australia's best batsman and the "red-hot favourite for the captaincy", but had lost to Peter May by a crushing 345 runs when he led an Australian XI against the tourists and this must have affected their decision. Benaud had been picked as vice-captain to Arthur Morris for the Second Test against England in 1954-55, but Morris sought advice from more senior players and Ian Johnson returned for the next Test. In 1958 Benaud was made captain of New South Wales, but had yet to lead them in a Sheffield Shield match when he was made the national captain, but accepted the challenge with energy. A great believer of the saying "practice makes perfect" he trained himself and the team and honed their athletic advantage over the visitors. In particular he heightened their already formidable fielding skills, which he used to dry up the runs of the England batsmen, and their catching became phenomenal. He also encouraged quick running between the wickets to steal runs and unsettle the England bowlers. In the field his tactical genius proved decisive with cunning bowling changes and inventive fields, though he was happy to take advice from the more experienced Harvey and other players. His reputation reached such heights that a simple field change would torment batsmen who tried to work out what he was doing. In the Fourth Test "he moved short leg round a couple of yards...there was no reason for the move other than to apply psychological pressure. He was a master at upsetting the concentration of batsmen" Always aggressive and willing to take risks he proved to be one of the greatest captains in cricket and won his first five Tests series as captain, the sixth he drew to retain The Ashes. As a player, he grew into the role, becoming the first cricketer to make 2,000 runs and take 200 wickets in Tests and his 248 wickets was an Australian record until beaten by Dennis Lillee. When he retired he became a famous broadcaster and journalist and would sometimes jokingly depreciate his captaincy, saying that "the hallmark of a great captain is the ability to win the toss at the right time", but in 1958-59 he lost the toss in the first four Tests and still won three the regain The Ashes.

The Batsmen

Colin McDonald was captain of Victoria and an effective opener with a short backlift who had made centuries against South Africa and the West Indies and had stood up to Tyson in 1954-55. He made as fighting 32 and 89 in "Laker's Test", but failed in the rest of the 1956 series. In 1958-59 McDonald's 519 runs (64.87) made him the first batsmen to top 500 runs in an Ashes series since Len Hutton in 1950-51 and the first Australian to do so since Don Bradman in 1948. His opening partner was Jim Burke a stonewaller who took 578 minutes to make 189 against South Africa in 1957-58 Cape Town and was the butt of the Sydney Hill barrackers; "Burkey, you're so like a statue, I wish I were a pigeon" He didn't make many runs in 1958-59 though he tended to hang around and retired at the end of the season rather than face the increasingly number of fast bowlers. Neil Harvey was Australia's premier batsmen after the retirement of Don Bradman, a left-handed strokemaker whose technique allowed him to make runs while other could hardly get bat to ball. Norm O'Neill made his debut in this series and was like a breath of fresh air in the stagnant cricket of the late 1950s. Athletic, good-looking and a positive strokemaker he was hailed as the "New Bradman" and a favourite with the crowds. Crowds flocked to his games just to see the "Australian Hope" and his striking 71 not out to win the First Test made a mockery of the England's funeral second innings. After Harvey and O'Neill came Ken Mackay sarcastically called "Slasher Mackay" as he rarely indulged in strokeplay, instead the ungainly Queenslander set about occupying the crease for as long a possible. He never made a Test century and only averaged 33.48, but always seemed to make runs when Australia was in trouble. Les Favell had a terrible time as an opener against Tyson and Statham in 1954-55, but was now a powerful middle-order batsman and crowd favourate who replaced Peter Burge after the First Test. Worth a mention is Bobby Simpson, a batting prodigy to match Norm O'Neill and an outstanding slip fielder, who made a duck in his only Test innings in the series, but was often 12th man and used as a substitute fielder. In the lower order were Richie Benaud and Alan Davidson, both hard-hitting all-rounders who liked to attack the bowling, but whose late order heroics were seldom needed.

The Bowlers

With the retirement of Keith Miller, Bill Johnston, Ken Archer and Ian Johnson in 1956 Australia needed to rebuild their bowling attack. Ray Lindwall would continue to play until 1960, and would overtake Clarrie Grimmett's Australian record of 216 wickets. However, he was now 37 and was no longer the fast-bowler who had terrorised the England team in the 1940s even though he swung the ball heavily. Considering the bent elbows of Australia's latest talent and the purists dubbed him "the last of Australia's straight-arm bowlers". Fortunately the all-rounders Alan Davidson and Richie Benaud came good in the 1957-58 South African tour after years of underperforming. "Davo" was a left-handed fast-medium swing bowler who came round the wicket and could move the ball either way off the pitch or through the air. Dogged by perennial injuries he took only 16 wickets (34.06) between 1953 and 1957, but starting in 1957-58 he would take 23 wickets or more in six out of seven series. Tom Graveney thought he was "possibly the greatest left-arm new-ball bowler in the history of cricket" and with the exceptionally low Test average of 20.53 it is difficult to argue with him. The captain Richie Benaud had in the last year emerged as probably the finest leg spinner in the world and his 31 wickets (18.83) in the series was the most taken for Australia against England since Monty Noble in 1901-02. No great spinner of the ball, he was able to produce subtle variations, and unlike most leg-spinners was very economical. After these three greats Australia's bowling was less dependable, or acceptable. Ian Meckiff took 17 wickets (17.17) with his fast left hand swing bowling, but was never able to overcome the accusations of throwing that beset his career. His unusual style gave him the ability to swing the ball at high speed and the flick of his hand made it difficult for the batsman to read the ball. Meckiff was definitely fast, saying he "likes to make them whistle", but erratic, sometimes bowling balls two feet off the stumps on either side of the wicket. When Meckiff was ill the 6'5" Giant Rorke came in and proved to be just as dangerous, taking 3/23 in the first innings of the Fourth Test and was sometimes almost unplayable as many balls pitched wide of the crease.

The Fielding

Richie Benaud has a fine team; he inspired them in the field and the team brought off some wonderful catches, and generally I thought Australia's out-cricket was some of the best I have seen.
Peter May

With their baseball experience Australia were traditionally a stronger fielding side than England, but had been outclassed in 1956. Richie Benaud saw this as an area in which they could dominate and set about improving their already athletic skills to an extraordinary level. In this he was helped by having outstanding fielders in wicket-keeper Wally Grout, Neil Harvey and Norm O'Neill in the covers, Bobby Simpson and Jim Burke in the slips, "The Claw" Alan Davidson in any close catching position and Benaud himself in the gully. Their efforts make the English fielders look pedestrian, dried up the runs and restricted strokeplay and the spectacular England collapses can be attributed to their ability to turn half-chances were into catches. Wally Grout had played second string to Don Tallon at Queensland since the war and Gil Langley and Len Maddocks for Australia since Tallon's retirement in 1953. As a result, he was 30 when he played in his first Test on the 1957-58 South African tour, when he held a record 6 catches in an innings. He soon established himself as the best wicket-keeper in the world and when he retired in 1966 his 187 dismissals in 51 Tests was second only to Godfrey Evans's 219 in 91 Tests.

Test statistics
Below are the Test statistics of the Australian squad.

First Test - Brisbane

See Main Article - 1958-59 Ashes series

Second Test - Melbourne

See Main Article - 1958-59 Ashes series

Third Test - Sydney

See Main Article - 1958-59 Ashes series

Fourth Test - Adelaide

See Main Article - 1958-59 Ashes series

Fifth Test - Melbourne

See Main Article - 1958-59 Ashes series

References

Bibliography
 
 
 Ashley Brown, The Pictorial History of Cricket, Bison Books, 1988
 Cris Freddi, The Guinness Book of Cricket Blunders, Guinness Publishing, 1996
 Tom Graveney with Norman Giller, The Ten Greatest Test Teams, Sidgewick & Jackson, 1988
 E.W. Swanton, Swanton in Australia, with MCC 1946-1975, Fontana, 1977
 Fred Trueman, As It Was, The Memoirs of Fred Trueman, Pan Books, 2004

Annual reviews
 Playfair Cricket Annual 1959
 Wisden Cricketers' Almanack 1960

Further reading
 
 
 Richie Benaud, A tale of two Tests: With some thoughts on captaincy, Hodder & Stoughton, 1962
 Mark Browning, Richie Benaud: Cricketer, Captain, Guru, Kangaroo Press, 1996
 Robert Coleman, Seasons in the Sun: the Story of the Victorian Cricket Association, Hargreen Publishing, 1993.
 Bill Frindall, The Wisden Book of Test Cricket 1877-1978, Wisden, 1979
 David Frith, Pageant of Cricket, The Macmillan Company of Australia, 1987
 David Frith, England Versus Australia: An Illustrated History of Every Test Match Since 1877, Viking, 2007
 Chris Harte, A History of Australian Cricket, Andre Deutsch, 1993
 Ken Kelly and David Lemmon, Cricket Reflections : Five Decades of Cricket Photographs, Heinemann, 1985
 Alban George Moyes, Benaud & Co: The story of the Tests, 1958–1959, Angus & Robertson, 1959
 Ray Robinson, On Top Down Under, Cassell, 1975
 E.W. Swanton (ed), The Barclays World of Cricket, Collins, 1986
 
 Bernard Whimpress, Chuckers: A history of throwing in Australian cricket, Elvis Press, 2004.
 Bob Willis and Patrick Murphy, Starting with Grace, Stanley Paul, 1986

External links

1958 in Australian cricket
1959 in Australian cricket
Australian cricket seasons from 1945–46 to 1969–70